William L. Jorgensen (born October 5, 1949, New York) is a Sterling Professor of Chemistry at Yale University. He is considered a pioneer in the field of computational chemistry. Some of his contributions include the TIP3P, TIP4P, and TIP5P water models, the OPLS force field, and his work on free-energy perturbation theory for modeling reactions in solution, protein-ligand binding, and
drug design;  he has over 400 publications in the field. Jorgensen has been the Editor of the ACS Journal of Chemical Theory and Computation since its founding in 2005.

Background and achievements 
Jorgensen earned a bachelor's degree from Princeton University in 1970 and a Ph.D. from Harvard University in 1975 in Chemical Physics while studying under Elias J. Corey. Jorgensen then worked at Purdue University from 1975 to 1990 first as an assistant professor and then later as a Professor. He joined the Yale faculty in 1990 and has remained there since. Jorgensen's work has been recognized by many awards including election to the American Academy of Arts and Sciences, the National Academy of Sciences, and the International Academy of Quantum and Molecular Sciences. He has also received the ACS Award for Computers in Chemical and Pharmaceutical Research, the ACS Hildebrand Award, and the 2015 Tetraheron Prize.

Research interests 
Jorgensen's research interests are broad and include the calculation of free energy of reactions using quantum mechanics, molecular mechanics, and Metropolis Monte Carlo methods, with application to the calculation of protein-ligand binding affinities, which have pharmaceutical applications. Most generally, the research goals include the development of theoretical and computational methods in an attempt to gain a deeper understanding of the structure and reactivity for organic and biomolecular systems. Another relevant research topic of his is in the development of improved NNRTI's, which are used for the treatment of HIV.

See also 
 BOSS (molecular mechanics)
OPLS

Sources

External links 
 http://zarbi.chem.yale.edu/index.html
 http://zarbi.chem.yale.edu/~bill/vita.html
 http://www.rib-x.com/corporate_overview/sab/jorgensen.shtml
 http://www.chem.yale.edu/faculty/jorgensen.html
 http://pubs.acs.org/journals/jcisd8/profiles.html

21st-century American chemists
Living people
1949 births
Yale University faculty
Harvard University alumni
Princeton University alumni
Yale Sterling Professors
Members of the United States National Academy of Sciences
Computational chemists